Mustafa Elvan Cantekin (1878 – 21 October 1955) was a military physician of the Ottoman Army and a politician in the Republic of Turkey. He was one of the founding members of Vatan ve Hürriyet secret society, which was just one of the several organizations opposed to the regime of the Ottoman sultan Abdul Hamid II.

Sources

1878 births
1955 deaths
People from Çorum
People from Angora vilayet
Republican People's Party (Turkey) politicians
Deputies of Çorum
Ottoman military doctors
Ottoman Army officers
Ottoman military personnel of the Balkan Wars
Ottoman military personnel of World War I
Turkish military personnel of the Greco-Turkish War (1919–1922)
Ottoman Military Medical Academy alumni
Recipients of the Medal of Independence with Red Ribbon (Turkey)
19th-century physicians from the Ottoman Empire
20th-century physicians from the Ottoman Empire